Saeed Mozaffari (born 3 June 1941 in Shahrud, Iran) is an Iranian dubbing director and voice actor.
 Most of his dubbing is with Brad Pitt and Jackie Chan. Saeed Mozaffari started working in the field of dubbing around 1962.

References

External links  
 صفحه در وبگاه سوره سینما
 وبلاگ صداهای ماندگار
 وبلاگ دوستداران هنر دوبله 

1941 births
Iranian male voice actors
Living people
Iranian radio and television presenters